Nelson Agresta del Carro (born August 2, 1955 in Montevideo, Uruguay) is a Uruguayan former footballer, who played for clubs of Uruguay, Argentina, Chile and Ecuador and the Uruguay national football team.

Titles
 Defensor Sporting 1976 (Uruguayan Primera División Championship)
 Uruguay 1983 (Copa América)

References

External links
 
 
 Profile at San Luis.cl 
 Profile at Tenfield Digital  

1955 births
Living people
Uruguayan footballers
Uruguayan expatriate footballers
Uruguay international footballers
Estudiantes de La Plata footballers
Argentinos Juniors footballers
L.D.U. Portoviejo footballers
San Luis de Quillota footballers
Club Nacional de Football players
Liverpool F.C. (Montevideo) players
Defensor Sporting players
Club Atlético River Plate (Montevideo) players
Sud América players
Uruguayan Primera División players
Chilean Primera División players
Argentine Primera División players
Expatriate footballers in Chile
Expatriate footballers in Argentina
Expatriate footballers in Ecuador
Expatriate football managers in China
1983 Copa América players
Copa América-winning players
Hebei F.C. managers
Association football midfielders
Uruguayan football managers